Biquz (also Romanized as Bīqūz) is a village in Targavar Rural District, Silvaneh District, Urmia County, West Azerbaijan Province, Iran. At the 2006 census, its population was 59, in 9 families.

References 

Populated places in Urmia County